François Michel Le Tellier, Marquis of Louvois (18 January 1641 – 16 July 1691) was the French Secretary of State for War during a significant part of the reign of Louis XIV.  Together with his father, Michel le Tellier, he oversaw an increase in the numbers of the French Army, eventually reaching 340,000 soldiers – an army that would fight four wars between 1667 and 1713. He is commonly referred to as "Louvois".

Early life
Louvois was born in Paris on 18 January 1641, to Michel Le Tellier, and Élisabeth Turpin. Louvois received instructions from his father in the management of state affairs. The young man won the king's confidence, and in 1666 he succeeded his father as war minister.

His talents were perceived by Turenne in the War of Devolution (1667–68), who gave him instruction in the art of providing armies. After the peace of Aix-la-Chapelle, Louvois devoted himself to organising the French army. The years between 1668 and 1672, says Camille Rousset, "were years of preparation, when Lionne was labouring with all his might to find allies, Colbert to find money, and Louvois soldiers for Louis".

The Man in the Iron Mask, whose name was given as Eustache Dauger, is first mentioned in a letter written by Louvois, dated 19 July 1669.

Work

The work of Louvois in these years is bound up with the historical development of the French army and of armies in general. Here need only be mentioned Louvois's reorganization of the military orders of merit, his foundation of the Hôtel des Invalides, and the almost forcible enrollment of the nobility and gentry of France, in which Louvois carried out part of Louis's measures for curbing the spirit of independence by service in the army or at court.

The success of his measures is to be seen in the victories of the Franco-Dutch War of 1672–78. After the Peace of Nijmegen Louvois was high in favour, his father had been made chancellor, and the influence of Colbert was waning. The ten years of peace between 1678 and 1688 were distinguished in French history by the rise of Madame de Maintenon, the capture of Strasbourg and the revocation of the Edict of Nantes, in all of which Louvois bore a prominent part. The surprise of Strasbourg in 1681 in time of peace was not only planned but executed by Louvois and Monclar. A saving clause in the revocation of the Edict of Nantes, which provided for some liberty of conscience, if not of worship, Louvois sharply annulled with the phrase "Sa majesté veut qu'on fasse sentir les dernières rigueurs a ceux qui ne voudront pas se faire de sa religion" ("His Majesty wishes the worst harshness on those who do not partake of his religion").

He claimed also the credit of inventing the dragonnades, and mitigated the depredations of the soldiery only insofar as the licence accorded was prejudicial to discipline. Discipline, indeed, and complete subjection to the royal authority was the political faith of Louvois.

Later life
Colbert died in 1683 and had been replaced by Le Pelletier, an adherent of Louvois, in the controller-generalship of finances, and by Louvois himself in his ministry for public buildings, which he took that he might be the minister able to gratify the king's two favourite pastimes, war and building. Louvois was able to superintend the successes of the first years of the war of the League of Augsburg and in 1688 initiated the collection of Plans-Reliefs of French strongholds that is now the Musée des Plans-Reliefs. However, he died suddenly of apoplexy after leaving the king's cabinet on 16 July 1691, but Voltaire claims in "Le Siecle de Louis XIV" that Louvois died while he was taking waters in Balaruc. His sudden death caused suspicion of poison.

Legacy

Louvois was one of the greatest of the rare class of great war ministers. French history can only point to Carnot as his equal. Both had to organize armies out of old material on a new system, both were admirable contrivers of campaigns, and both devoted themselves to the material well-being of the soldiers. In private life and in the means employed for gaining his ends, Louvois was unscrupulous.

Family

Louvois, through a marriage arranged by his father, wed an heiress, Anne de Souvré, Marquise de Courtenvaux.

He had six children with Anne:
 Michael François, Marquis of Courtanvaux, who married the daughter of Jean II d'Estrées
 Madeleine Charlotte (1665–1735), who married François de La Rochefoucauld VIII, Duc de La Roche-Guyon (1663–1728)
 Louis-Nicolas, Marquis de Souvré
 Louis François Marie, Marquis Barbezieux
 Camille de Louvois
 Margaret (died 1711), married Louis Nicolas de Neufville de Villeroy, Marquis of Alincourt

See also
 French government ministers
 List of Finance Ministers of France
 Fort Louvois

Notes

References
 
Attribution:
  Endnotes:
 The principal authority for Louvois's life and times is Camille Rousset's Histoire de Louvois (Paris, 1872), a great work founded on the 900 volumes of his despatches at the Depôt de la Guerre. Saint Simon from his class prejudices is hardly to be trusted, but Madame de Sevigne throws many side-lights on his times. Testament politique de Louvois (1695) is spurious.

Francois-Michel
Secretaries of State for War (France)
17th-century French politicians
Politicians from Paris
Marquesses of Louvois
1641 births
1691 deaths
Heads of the Bâtiments du Roi
Recipients of the Order of Saint Lazarus
Affair of the Poisons